Gonow (officially Zhejiang Gonow Auto Co., Ltd.) is a Chinese manufacturer of automobiles, commercial vehicles and SUV's headquartered in Taizhou, Zhejiang and a subsidiary of GAC Group. It markets its products under the brand name GAC Gonow in China and as Gonow in other markets.

History
The company was founded on 27 September 2003 with headquarters in Taizhou, Zhejiang. The campus covers an area of 268,000 m2. Production began with the Gonow AGE, with an initial phase of 60,000 units produced. Gonow spent 351.5 million RMB expanding its grounds by 100 acres, and increasing production to 200,000 units per year. They also began cooperation with Wuhan University of Technology, taking over construction of the Gonow Automobile R&D Center.

In 2006, Gonow entered the European Union market, in a joint venture with the Italian company DR Motor Company SpA.  Two SUV models were produced under license, and were marketed under the brand name Katay Gonow.

On 24 October 2010, Gonow was the first Chinese car to score points in a FIA world championship, with its Italian Team Sonia Ielo – Francesca Olivoni taking 8th place in the Ecorally San Marino – Vatican City of the FIA Alternative Energies Cup.

In 2010, Guangzhou Automobile Group Co. (GAC) bought 51% of Gonow. Gonow announced in March 2015 that the company will start concentrating on constructing Trumpchi vehicles, raising anger from its dealers since the unsold Gonow vehicles and spare parts were mortgaged by various banks.

In 2015, GAC Group announced that Gonow will be integrated into the company as a subsidiary. It's been reported that the 49% stake of Gonow will be purchased and will halt further production/sales in 2016 due to problems in committing to aftermarket sales and production/delivery of its vehicles to Gonow dealers.

Products 

 Gonow Starry (Xinglang/ 星朗) (2013–present)
 Gonow GX6 (2014–present)
 Gonow Troy 500 (财运 500/FAN)
 Gonow GP150 (since 2015)
 Gonow Way (Xingwang/ Star Wang/ 星旺) (since 2010)
 Gonow Way L (星旺 L)
 Gonow Way CL (星旺 CL)

 Gonow Alter (since 2003)
 Gonow Dual Luck (since 2003)
 Gonow Troy 200 (财运) (since 2005)
 Gonow FAN (since 2005)
 Gonow Finite (since 2010)
 Gonow GA6380 (since 2010)
 Gonow GA6530 (since 2010), a van based on the Toyota HiAce (H100) with a restyled front end that resembles the Toyota HiAce (H200)
 Gonow GS-1 (since 2010)
 Gonow GS-2 (since 2010)
 Gonow GX6 (since 2005, Chinese version)
 Gonow GS50 II (since 2005)
 Gonow Minivan (2008–2010)
 Gonow Saboo (since 2010)
 Gonow Jetstar (since 2003, also known as Shuaijian) also known as GS50 from 2005
 Gonow Lightweight (since 2010)
 Gonow E Mei (since 2014)

Katay Gonow 
 Katay Gonow Troy (since 2006)
 Katay Gonow Victor (since 2006)
 Katay Gonow Victory (since 2006)

Former Products 
 Gonow Troy 300 (财运 300) (2007–2009)
 Gonow Aoosed G5 (2010–2014)

Product gallery

References

External links

Official website of the Zhejiang Gonow Auto Co., Ltd.
Gonow Auto Global

Vehicle manufacturing companies established in 2003
Vehicle manufacturing companies disestablished in 2016
Car manufacturers of China
GAC Group divisions and subsidiaries
Truck manufacturers of China
Companies based in Zhejiang
Chinese brands